The Kieskautberg is a hill located two kilometres south of the German village of Carlsberg in the east of the Diemerstein Forest, which is part of the northern Palatine Forest.

The boundary between the collective municipalities of Freinsheim (south) and Grünstadt-Land (north) runs over the hill.
The hill is covered by mixed forest. Its summit is accessible from Hertlingshausen by a footpath managed by the Palatine Forest Club, which is marked by a red circle .

References 

Mountains and hills of Rhineland-Palatinate
Mountains and hills of the Palatinate Forest
Bad Dürkheim (district)